Mesosa albidorsalis is a species of beetle in the family Cerambycidae. It was described by Francis Polkinghorne Pascoe in 1865. It is known from Borneo, the Philippines, Singapore and Malaysia.

References

albidorsalis
Beetles described in 1865